Evdokiya is a Russian and Bulgarian variant of the Greek Eudokia (Ευδοκία), a feminine given name. It may refer to:

Evdokiya Rostopchina, Russian poet
Evdokiya Germanova, Russian actress. 
Evdokiya Maneva, Bulgarian politician
Evdokiya Popadinova, Bulgarian female footballer
2130 Evdokiya, minor planet

See also
Eudoxia (name) - covers all people, places, ships etc. named either Eudokia or derived variants of the name
Evdokija - Serbian variant

Bulgarian feminine given names